WCPK (1600 AM, La Voz de Dios 1600) is a Spanish Contemporary Christian formatted broadcast radio station licensed to Chesapeake, Virginia, serving the Southside of Hampton Roads.  WCPK is owned and operated by Hosanna Media Christian Group, Inc.

References

External links

1967 establishments in Virginia
Contemporary Christian radio stations in the United States
Spanish-language radio stations in the United States
Radio stations established in 1967

CPK